A regional election took place in Brittany on 21 March and 28 March 2004, along with all other regions. Jean-Yves Le Drian (PS) was elected President, defeating incumbent Josselin de Rohan (UMP).

2004
Brittany regional election